The history of magazines in Egypt is long, dating back to the 1890s. The earliest magazines included women's magazines as well as those published in Turkish from 1828 to 1947. In 1919 there were nearly more than thirty women's magazines in the country. The first children's magazine was published in 1893. The number of the magazines in the period 1828–1929 was 481.  

In 2014 the magazine market in the country was described as one of the lower-growth, smaller-scale markets.

The following is an incomplete list of current and defunct magazines published in Egypt. They may be published in Arabic or in other languages.

A

 Abu Naddara
 Adab wa Naqd  
Ad-Diya
 Akhbar Al-Adab
 Akher Saa
 Al Alam
 Al Ahram Al Arabi
 Al Ahram Al Iktisadi 
 Al Ahram Al Riyadi
 Al Ahram Weekly
 Al Arghul
 Anis Al-Jalis
Apollo
 Arab Observer
 Arek Monthly
 Arev Monthly
 Ar-Rawi
 Arrissalah
 Artemis
 Al Arusa
L'Aurore
 Az-Zuhur

B

 Baba Sadiq
 Al-Balagh al-Usbuʿi
 Al Bayan
 Bint Al Nil
Business Today Egypt

C
 Cairo 360
 Cairo West Magazine

D
 Al Dawa
 Don Quichotte

E
Egypt Today
 L'Égyptienne
El-Shai.com

F

 Al Fajr
 Al Fajr Al Jadid
 Al Fatat 
 Fatat al-Sharq
 Al Fath
 La Femme Nouvelle
 Al Fukaha

G
 Galerie 68

H
 Hawaa
 Al Hilal
 HR Revolution Middle East

I
Ibdaa
Identity
Israël

J
 Al-Jamia
 Al Jamila

K

 Kanun-i Esasi
 Al Kashkul
 Al-Katib al-misri
 Al Kawakib
 Kull shay

L
 Al Lataif
 Lotus
Lounge

M

 Magazette
 Al Majalla
 Majallat Al Azhar
 Al Majalla Al Jadida
 Al Manar
 Al-Maʿrifa 
 Al-Muqtataf
 Al-Musawar

N
 Al Nadhir
 Nesf El Donya

O
 October
 Omdurman

R
Ar-Rawi
 Rose al-Yūsuf

S

Sahifat Dar al-Ulum
 Al Siyassa Al Dawliya
 Al Siyassa Al Musawwara
 Al Siyasa Al Usbuiya

T

Al Tali'a
Al Tatawwur
Al Thaqafa
At-Tahdhib
Tok Tok

U
 Al Ustadh

W
 Weghat Nazar

Z
 Zamalek SC magazine

See also
 Media of Egypt
 List of newspapers in Egypt
 List of radio stations in Egypt
 Television in Egypt

References

Mass media in Egypt
Egypt
Magazines